State Road 816 (SR 816), locally known as 
It extends from the Sawgrass Expressway east to an intersection with SR A1A (Ocean Boulevard) in Fort Lauderdale.

Route description

Oakland Park Boulevard passes through mainly residential zones of Sunrise, Lauderhill, Lauderdale Lakes, Oakland Park, Wilton Manors, and Fort Lauderdale. It starts as a spur of Exit 3 of the Sawgrass Expressway, and then merges with the northern terminus of Flamingo Road (SR 823) as it heads east.

After passing US 441, SR 816 enters the city of Oakland Park. For , SR 816 passes through residential zones, with some businesses dotting the road, until its interchange with Interstate 95 (I-95). Soon after, SR 816 intersects the Dixie Highway, followed by an intersection with Federal Highway one mile later as the road enters Fort Lauderdale. The Coral Ridge Mall is located at the northeast corner of the intersection with Federal Highway.

After Federal Highway, SR 816 continues for another mile before terminating at Ocean Boulevard (SR A1A).

Major intersections

References

External links

816
816
816